Shabnam Shakeel (12 March 1942 – 2 March 2013) was a Pakistani poet, writer, and academician. Shabnam spent her early life in Lahore, Pakistan, and received a master's degree in Urdu literature. During her career, she worked as a lecturer at several colleges in Pakistan. Her first book Tanqeedi Mazameen, was published in 1965. She won numerous awards, honours and titles for her contributions to Urdu literature including the prestigious presidents' Pride of Performance award in 2005.

Biography 
Shabnam was born on 12 March 1942 in Lahore, Pakistan. Her father Syed Abid Ali Abid was a poet and academician and thus she was given the opportunity to grow up in a literary environment and was exposed to notable people such as Ghulam Mustafa Tabassum and Faiz Ahmad Faiz. She was a student at Kinnaird College and graduated from Islamia College, both in Lahore. She received a Master of Arts degree in Urdu literature from Oriental College, Lahore.

After finishing her studies, she joined Queen's Mary College, Lahore as a professor of Urdu language and literature. For the next 30 years, she worked as a teacher at different colleges in Pakistan such as Lahore College for Women University, Government Girls College, Quetta, and Federal Government College F-7/2 in Islamabad.

In 1967, she married Syed Shakeel Ahmad who was a civil servant. The couple had two sons, Waqar Hasnain Ahmad and Jehanzeb Ahmad, and one daughter Malahat Awan.

Shabnam died on 2 March 2013 in Karachi. Her Namaz-e-Janaza was offered in F-11 Graveyard in Islamabad on March 3.

Prime Minister Raja Pervaiz Ashraf gave his condolences to the family in a message expressing his grief over her death.

Literary works 
Her first book, Tanqeedi Mazameen was published in 1965. Some of her other published poetry collections were Shabzaad (1987), Izteraab (1994), Taqreeb Kuch Tau (2003) and Musafat Raigan Thi (2008).

Bibliography 
 Tanqeedi Mazameen, 1965, Classic Publishers, Lahore
 Shabzad (Poetic Collection), 1987, Maavra Publishers Lahore
 Iztaraab (Poetic Collection), 1994, Sangemeel Publishers, Lahore
 Taqreeb Kuch Tau (Critics/penpictures of personalities), 2003, Sangemeel Publishers, Lahore
 Na Qafas Na Ashiana (Short Stories), 2004, Sangemeel Publishers, Lahore
 Musafat Raigan The (Poetic Collection), Sangemeel Publishers, Lahore
 Khawateen ki Shaaeeri (1947 to 2002) aur Muasharay par iskay asarat (sponsored by M/O Women Development)
 Hasrat Mohani Ka Taghazzul (in press)

Awards 
The following is a list of awards bestowed upon Shabnam during her literary career:
 President's Pride of Performance Award, 2005
 Awards of Recognition – Hamdard Foundation, 1994
 Bolan Award (Shabzad – Poetic Collection), 1988
 Govt. of Baluchistan's Award for Country's Prominent Women
 Shabnam Shakeel ki Shakhsiat aur Shaairy (Research Paper) by Mubashira Nasreen, Urdu Department, N.U.M.L. (2000)
 Various awards by prominent social and literary organizations of Pakistan
 Life Member, Pakistan Academy of Letters
 Member PTV Censor Board Channel 3
 Member scholarships committee, Pakistan Academy of Letters
 Member Punjab Public Library Board, Lahore
 Member Jury (Award) Radio Pakistan, PTVC Perveen Shakir Trust & Academy of Letters Hijra Awards
 Bhaha-ud-Din Zakriya University Multan's research paper: Shabnam Shakeel ki shakhsiat aur funn (M.Phil)
 Lahore University of Management Sciences has included her poetry in its management sciences BSc honors course.

References 

1942 births
2013 deaths
Urdu-language poets from Pakistan
Pakistani poets
Recipients of the Pride of Performance
Kinnaird College for Women University alumni
Government Islamia College alumni
Academic staff of Lahore College for Women University
20th-century poets